The Helgoland class''' was the second class of dreadnought battleships to be built for the German  (Imperial Navy). The design was a significant improvement over the previous  ships; they had a larger main battery— main guns instead of the  weapons mounted on the earlier vessels—and an improved propulsion system. The Helgolands were easily distinguished from the preceding Nassaus by the three funnels that were closely arranged, compared to the two larger funnels of the previous class. The ships retained the hexagonal main battery layout of the Nassau class.

The ships served as a unit in I Division, I Battle Squadron alongside the Nassau-class ships in II Division of the squadron. They saw combat during World War I, including the Battle of Jutland in the North Sea and the Battle of the Gulf of Riga in the Baltic. All four survived the war, but were not taken as part of the German fleet that was interned at Scapa Flow. When the German ships at Scapa Flow were scuttled, the four Helgolands were ceded as war reparations to the victorious Allied powers in the sunken ships' stead. Ostfriesland was taken by the US Navy and expended as a target during Billy Mitchell's air power demonstration in July 1921. Helgoland and Oldenburg were allotted to Britain and Japan respectively, and broken up in 1921. Thüringen was delivered to France in 1920, and was used as a target ship for the French navy. The ship was eventually broken up between 1923 and 1933.

 Design 
The Triple Entente between the United Kingdom, France, and Russia had been signed in 1907. Germany had become significantly isolated—on the Continent, Germany was hemmed in by France in the west and Russia in the east, and the UK, with her powerful navy, was capable of blocking German access to the world shipping lanes. Admiral Alfred von Tirpitz reacted to this development with the request for newer and stronger capital ships. His thoughts on the matter were, "The aim which I had to keep in view ... for technical and organizing reasons as well as reasons of political finance was to build as steadily as possible." His appeal came in the form of the proposed Second Amendment to the Naval Law, which was passed on 27 March 1908.

For the second class of German dreadnoughts, there was considerable debate as to what changes would be made from the first design. In May 1906, the Reichsmarineamt (RMA, Imperial Navy Office) received word that the British were building battleships equipped with  guns. Tirpitz was reluctant to agree to this change, as he wished to avoid escalating the arms race with Britain.

Tirpitz's hesitation at increasing the armament of the new ships was lost when it became known in early 1907 that the United States Navy was building battleships with 30.5 cm guns. Some dispute remained over the arrangement of the main battery. The two s being built for Brazil mounted the same number of guns, but in a more efficient arrangement. Superfiring turret pairs were placed on either end of the ship, with two wing turrets amidships. Tirpitz favored adopting this arrangement for the Helgoland class, but the Construction Department felt two superfiring turrets could be easily disabled by a single hit. As a result, the hexagonal arrangement of the preceding Nassaus was retained.

The Naval Law stipulated that the lifespan of large warships was to be reduced from 25 years to 20 years; this was done in an effort to force the Reichstag to allocate funds for additional ships. The battleships that Tirpitz had failed to secure in the First Amendment to the Naval Law of 1906 were now approved by the Reichstag. The Naval Law also increased the naval budget by an additional 1 billion marks. After the four s had been replaced by the four Nassaus, three of the Siegfried-class ships—, —and the unique coastal defense ship Oldenburg were the next slated to be replaced. The Helgoland-class ships—SMS Helgoland, SMS Ostfriesland, SMS Thüringen, and SMS Oldenburg—were ordered under the provisional names Ersatz Siegfried, Ersatz Oldenburg, Ersatz Beowulf, and Ersatz Frithjof, respectively.

 General characteristics 
The Helgoland-class ships were longer than their predecessors, at  overall. The ships had 17 watertight compartments and a double bottom for 86% of the length of the hull.

The class had greatly improved handling characteristics over the preceding Nassau class. The Helgolands were much better sea boats and did not suffer from the severe rolling that the Nassaus did. The ships were responsive to the helm, and had a tight turning radius, and lost only minimal speed during swells. The ships lost up to 54% of their speed at hard rudder, and would heel up to 7°. For comparison, the earlier Nassaus lost up to 70% speed and held a 12° heel with the rudder hard over.

 Propulsion 

The Helgoland-class ships retained older triple-expansion steam engines rather than the new steam turbines in use in the British Royal Navy. This decision was based solely on cost: at the time, Parsons held a monopoly on steam turbines and required a 1 million gold mark royalty fee for every turbine engine. The triple-expansion engines were three-shaft, four-cylinder engines arranged in three engine rooms. The engines were powered by 15 marine-type boilers with two fireboxes apiece for a total of 30. The ships carried  of coal, and were later modified to carry an additional  of oil that was to be sprayed on the coal to increase its burn rate. The ships' electrical power was provided by eight turbo-generators that produced 2,000 kW (225 V).

 Armament 

Like the Nassau class which preceded it, the Helgoland-class ships carried their main armament in an unusual hexagonal configuration. Twelve 30.5 cm SK L/50 guns were emplaced in long-trunk Drh LC/1908 mountings, an improved version of the previous LC/1907 and LC/1906 mounts used in the Nassau class. The guns were arranged in pairs in six twin gun turrets, with one turret each fore and aft, and two on each flank of the ship. The guns could initially be depressed to −8° and elevated to 13.5°, although the turrets were later modified to allow −5.5° depression and 16° of elevation. The guns had a total of 1,020 rounds for 85 shells per gun.

The ships' secondary armament consisted of fourteen  SK L/45 guns, which were mounted in casemates. The ships also carried fourteen  SK L/45 guns, also in casemates. After 1914, two 8.8 cm guns were removed and replaced by two 8.8 cm Flak guns, and between 1916 and 1917, the remaining twelve 8.8 cm casemated guns were removed. The Helgoland-class ships were further armed with six  submerged torpedo tubes. One tube was mounted in the bow, another in the stern, and two on each broadside, on either ends of the torpedo bulkhead.

 Armor 
The Helgoland-class ships were protected with Krupp cemented armor, in almost the same layout as in the preceding Nassau-class ships. The only major differences were slight increases in the armor protection for the main and secondary batteries, and a much thicker roof for the forward conning tower. The casemated secondary battery had  worth of armor protection, and 8 cm thick gun shields. The Helgolands were also fitted with anti-torpedo nets, but these were removed after 1916.

 Construction 

Four ships of the class were ordered, under the provisional names Ersatz Siegfried (Helgoland), Ersatz Oldenburg (Ostfriesland), Ersatz Beowulf (Thüringen), and Ersatz Frithjof (Oldenburg), as replacements for three of the coastal defense ships of the Siegfried-class, and the unique coastal defense ship SMS Oldenburg. SMS Helgoland was built at Howaldtswerke, Kiel. She was laid down on 11 November 1908, launched 25 September 1909, and commissioned nearly two years later on 23 August 1911. SMS Ostfriesland was built at Kaiserliche Werft Wilhelmshaven. She was laid down 19 October 1908, launched five days after her sister Helgoland, on 30 September 1909, and commissioned 1 August 1911. SMS Thüringen was built by AG Weser in Bremen. She was laid down on 2 November 1908, launched on 27 November 1909, and commissioned on 1 July 1911. SMS Oldenburg, the final vessel, was built by Schichau in Danzig; she was laid down 1 March 1909, launched 30 June 1910, and commissioned on 1 May 1912.

Ships

 History 
The Helgoland-class ships operated as a unit in the High Seas Fleet; they served as I Division of I Battle Squadron. The ships of the class participated in several fleet operations in the North Sea, including the sortie on 31 May 1916 that resulted in the Battle of Jutland. The ships also saw limited service in the Baltic Sea, primarily during the abortive Battle of the Gulf of Riga in August 1915.

 Raid on Scarborough, Hartlepool and Whitby 

The first major operation of the war in which the Helgoland-class ships participated was the raid on Scarborough, Hartlepool and Whitby on 15–16 December 1914. The raid was primarily conducted by the battlecruisers of the I Scouting Group. Friedrich von Ingenohl, the commander of the High Seas Fleet, decided to take up station approximately in the center of the North Sea, about 130 miles east of Scarborough.

The Royal Navy, which had recently received the German code books captured from the beached cruiser , was aware that an operation was taking place, but was not sure where the Germans would strike. Therefore, the Admiralty ordered David Beatty's 1st Battlecruiser Squadron, the six battleships of the 2nd Battle Squadron, and several cruisers and destroyers to intercept the German battlecruisers. However, Beatty's task force nearly ran headlong into the entire High Seas Fleet. At 6:20, Beatty's destroyer screen came into contact with the German torpedo boat V155. This began a confused, 2-hour long battle between the British destroyers and the German cruiser and destroyer screen, often at very close range. Admiral Ingenohl, loath to disobey the Kaiser's order to not risk the battlefleet without his express approval, concluded that his forces were engaging the screen of the entire Grand Fleet, and so, 10 minutes after the first contact, he ordered a turn to port to a southeast course. Continued attacks delayed the turn, but by 6:42, it had been carried out. For about 40 minutes, the two fleets were steaming on a parallel course. At 7:20, Ingenohl ordered a further turn to port, which put his ships on a course for German waters.

Many in the German navy were furious over Ingenohl's timidity, and his reputation suffered greatly. Tirpitz remarked that "On 16 December, Ingenohl had the fate of Germany in the palm of his hand. I boil with inward emotion whenever I think of it." The captain of the battlecruiser  was even more scathing; he stated that Ingenohl had turned away "because he was afraid of eleven British destroyers which could have been easily eliminated ... Under the present leadership we will accomplish nothing."

The Helgoland-class ships also sortied from port to support the German battlecruisers during the Battle of Dogger Bank, but did not actively engage British forces.

 Battle of the Gulf of Riga 

On 3 August 1915, several heavy units of the High Seas Fleet were transferred to the Baltic to participate in a planned foray into the Riga Gulf. The intention was to destroy the Russian naval forces in the area, including the pre-dreadnought , and to use the minelayer  to block the entrance to Moon Sound with naval mines. The four Helgolands were not committed to the actual battle, however. For the duration of the operation, the ships were stationed outside the gulf in order to prevent Russian reinforcements from disrupting the laying of minefields.

The Russians' own minefields were larger than had been expected, and so clearing them took longer than the Germans had planned. This delay was compounded by stiff resistance from the Russian navy; Deutschland was ultimately unable to lay her mines. Reports of Allied submarine activity in the area prompted the withdrawal of the German naval force on the morning of 20 August. Indeed, the battlecruiser Moltke had been torpedoed by the British submarine  the day before, though only minor damage was sustained.

 Battle of Jutland 

The ships took part in the inconclusive Battle of Jutland on 31 May – 1 June 1916. For the majority of the battle, I Battle Squadron formed the center of the line of battle, behind Rear Admiral Behncke's III Battle Squadron, and followed by Rear Admiral Mauve's elderly pre-dreadnoughts of II Battle Squadron. Ostfriesland served as the division flagship, under the command of Vice Admiral E. Schmidt.

[[File:SMS Helgoland illustration.jpg|thumb|left|A recognition drawing prepared by the Royal Navy, with Helgolands main battery turned to starboard|alt=A large gray warship steams at full speed; thick black smoke pours from its three smoke stacks.]]

The Helgoland-class ships first entered direct combat at 19:20 on the first day of the battle. With the exception of Ostfriesland, the firing only lasted for four minutes, because the German line had been in the process of turning to the east-northeast, and the ships quickly lost sight of the British battleships. Thüringen and Helgoland only fired around 20 main battery shells before they lost sight of their target. Ostfriesland, however, was able to keep visual contact until 19:45, at which point she, too, ceased firing. At 20:15, during the third Gefechtskehrtwendung, Helgoland was struck by a  shell in the forward part of the ship. The shell tore a  hole in the hull and rained splinters on the foremost port side 5.9 in gun; approximately 80 tons of water entered the ship.

At around midnight on 1 June, the Helgoland- and Nassau-class ships in the center of the German line came into contact with the British 4th Destroyer Flotilla. A chaotic night battle ensued, during which  rammed the British destroyer . The 4th Flotilla broke off the action temporarily to regroup, but at around 01:00, unwittingly stumbled into the German dreadnoughts a second time. Oldenburg and Helgoland opened fire on the two leading British destroyers, but a British shell destroyed Oldenburgs forward search light. Shell fragments rained down on the bridge and wounded the ship's captain, Kapitän Hopfner, and killed his second in command, Kapitänleutnant Rabius, along with a number of other men on the bridge, including the helmsman. Oldenburg was temporarily without anyone to steer the ship; she was in danger of ramming either the ship to her rear or to her front. Kapitän Hopfner, despite his injuries, took the helm and brought the ship back into line.

Shortly after 01:00, Thüringen and Nassau encountered the British armored cruiser . Thüringen opened fire first and pummeled Black Prince with a total of 27 heavy-caliber shells and 24 rounds from her secondary battery.

By this time, the 4th Destroyer Flotilla had been largely destroyed as a fighting unit. The few remaining, heavily damaged ships had been scattered and would take no further part in the battle.

During the battle, the ships suffered only minor damage. Helgoland was hit by a single 15 in shell, but sustained minimal damage. The Oldenburg was hit by a shell from a secondary battery that killed 8 and wounded 14 men. Ostfriesland and Thüringen escaped the battle unscathed, although on the return to German waters, Ostfriesland struck a mine and had to be repaired in Wilhelmshaven.

 Post-war 

The ships of the class saw no further significant action during the war, and were ceded to the Allies under the terms of the Treaty of Versailles. All four ships were stricken from the German navy on 5 November 1919. Helgoland was taken by the British and was scrapped in 1921 in Morecambe. Her bow ornament was retained and was eventually returned to Germany; it is now on display in the Dresden army museum. Oldenburg was surrendered to the Japanese, but they did not take possession of the ship. Instead, they sold the vessel to a British salvage firm that scrapped it in Dordrecht in 1921. Thüringen was taken by France; the ship was nearly scuttled by her crew while en route to Cherbourg in 1920. She was used as a target until she was beached in 1923 at Gavres. She was broken up in situ, but a large portion of the hull remains off shore.Ostfriesland'' was ceded to the US Navy, and was later used as a stationary target during a demonstration of air power, conducted by General Billy Mitchell on 21 July 1921 off Cape Henry in Virginia. The ship sank at 12:40 after sustaining several bomb hits and near misses. However, she likely would have avoided these had she been underway, and if she had been hit, damage control teams would have kept the ship afloat.

Notes

Footnotes

Citations

References

Further reading
 
 

Battleship classes
 
Helgoland class battleship